Lee Philip Rudofsky (born 1979) is a United States district judge of the United States District Court for the Eastern District of Arkansas.

Biography 

Rudofsky received a Bachelor of Science and a Master of Public Administration from Cornell University, and a Juris Doctor from Harvard Law School. After law school, Rudofsky served as a law clerk to Justice Robert J. Cordy of the Massachusetts Supreme Judicial Court and to Judge Andrew Kleinfeld of the United States Court of Appeals for the Ninth Circuit. He then became an associate at Kirkland & Ellis, before serving as Deputy General Counsel to the Mitt Romney 2012 presidential campaign. In 2015, Rudofsky became Solicitor General of Arkansas, and he left that post in 2018 to become senior director for global anti-corruption compliance at Walmart. Rudofsky is Jewish.

Federal judicial service 

On July 1, 2019, President Donald Trump announced his intent to nominate Rudofsky to serve as a United States District Judge of the United States District Court for the Eastern District of Arkansas. Rudofsky was nominated to the seat vacated by Judge James Leon Holmes, who assumed senior status on March 31, 2018. On July 8, 2019, his nomination was sent to the United States Senate.  Senator Tom Cotton recommended his nomination. On July 31, 2019, a hearing on his nomination was held before the Senate Judiciary Committee. On October 17, 2019, his nomination was reported out of committee by a 12–10 vote. On November 6, 2019, the Senate voted 51–41 to invoke cloture on his nomination. On November 7, 2019, his nomination was confirmed by a 51–41 vote. He received his judicial commission on November 8, 2019.

Notable cases

In 2022, Rudofsky held that American citizens could not bring suit under Section 2 of the Voting Rights Act, instead concluding that provision could only be enforced by lawsuits filed directly by the Attorney General of the United States. His decision was widely criticized by legal commentators as standing in opposition to decades of Supreme Court precedent which had permitted private enforcement of the Voting Rights Act, effectively "gutting" the VRA and rendering it "largely unenforceable".

Memberships 

He has been a member of the Federalist Society since 2002.

See also 
 List of Jewish American jurists

References

External links 
 

|-

1979 births
Living people
21st-century American lawyers
21st-century American judges
Arkansas lawyers
Cornell University alumni
Federalist Society members
Harvard Law School alumni
Judges of the United States District Court for the Eastern District of Arkansas
People associated with Kirkland & Ellis
People from New York City
Solicitors General of Arkansas
United States district court judges appointed by Donald Trump